Iasonas Stavropoulos (born 10 January 2000) is a Greek professional footballer who plays as a midfielder for Super League 2 club Asteras Vlachioti.

Career

Panachaiki
On 16 August 2018, Stavropoulos signed a professional contract with Panachaiki.

On 1 March 2020, Stavropoulos made his professional debut against Chania.

References

External links

Iasonas Stavropoulos at pfc1891.gr

2000 births
Living people
Greek footballers
Football League (Greece) players
Super League Greece 2 players
Panachaiki F.C. players
Association football midfielders
Footballers from Patras